Butte, America is a 2008 documentary film about Butte, Montana's history as a copper mining town. It was created by Pamela Roberts, narrated by Gabriel Byrne, and includes a mix of first hand accounts and scholarly analysis  from John T. Shea, Marie Cassidy, David Emmons, and Janet Finn. The movie focuses on developments in American labor and production during the dawn of the electrical age in the 1880s when copper was discovered in Butte. The mining activity brought an influx of immigrant workers and their families to the boom town that grew to be a Western metropolis of 45,000 people forming a Rocky Mountain city that with similarities to Pittsburgh in the East. Labor relations and the corporate operations of Anaconda Copper are also related.

The film aired on the Independent Lens PBS show on  October 20, 2009.

References

External links
 
 
 Butte, America site for Independent Lens on PBS

2008 films
American documentary films
Butte, Montana
2008 documentary films
Documentary films about mining
History of mining
Films set in Montana
Documentary films about United States history
Mining in Montana
Documentary films about Montana
Anaconda Copper
2000s English-language films
2000s American films